The 1968-69 Penn State Nittany Lions men's basketball team represented the Pennsylvania State University during the 1968–69 NCAA University Division men's basketball season. The team was led by 1st-year head coach Johnny Bach, and played their home games at Rec Hall in University Park, Pennsylvania.

Schedule

References

Penn State Nittany Lions basketball seasons
Penn State
1968 in sports in Pennsylvania
1969 in sports in Pennsylvania